Gözde Kırdar Sonsırma ( Kırdar; born 26 June 1985) is a Turkish volleyball player that plays as outside hitter for Vakıfbank Spor Kulübü and the Turkish national team.

Personal life
Gözde is the twin sister of Eczacıbaşı VitrA setter Özge Kırdar. The Kirdar sisters played for Vakıfbank Spor Kulübü for years but Özge transferred to the rival side Eczacıbaşı VitrA in 2012. They are playing for national team together and both of them were the member of 2012 Summer Olympics squad of Turkey. Gozde is playing for Vakifbank Sport Club for 19 years. She  is married to Olympic physical trainer Alessandro Bracceschi from Italy in 2017 She is graduated from Maltepe University.

Career
She played for the national team at the 2003 FIVB Women's World Cup.

Kırdar won the gold medal and the Best Outside Hitter award at the 2013 Club World Championship playing with Vakıfbank Istanbul.

Awards

Individuals
CEV Champions League 2010–11 "Best Receiver"
2012-13 Turkish League Final Series "Most Valuable Player"
2012-13 Turkish League Final Series "Best Spiker"
2012-13 Turkish League Final Series "Best Receiver"
2013 FIVB Women's Club World Championship "Best Outside Hitter"
CEV Champions League 2017–18 "Most Valuable Player"

Clubs
2010–11 CEV Women's Champions League -   Champion, with VakıfBank Güneş Sigorta Türk Telekom
2011 FIVB Women's Club World Championship -  Runner-Up, with VakıfBank Türk Telekom
2011–12 Aroma Women's Volleyball League -  Runner-Up, with Vakıfbank Spor Kulübü
2012–13 Turkish Cup -  Champion, with Vakıfbank Spor Kulübü
2012–13 CEV Champions League -  Champion, with Vakıfbank Spor Kulübü
2012–13 Turkish Women's Volleyball League -  Champion, with Vakıfbank Spor Kulübü
2013 Club World Championship -  Champion, with Vakıfbank Spor Kulübü
2016–17 CEV Champions League -  Champion, with Vakıfbank Spor Kulübü
2017 FIVB Club World Championship -  Champion, with Vakıfbank Spor Kulübü
2017–18 Turkish Women's Volleyball League -  Champion, with Vakıfbank Spor Kulübü
2017–18 CEV Champions League -  Champion, with Vakıfbank Spor Kulübü

National team
2011 European Championship - 
2012 FIVB World Grand Prix - 
2013 Mediterranean Games -

See also
Turkish women in sports

References

External links
 Official website
 
 
 

1985 births
Living people
Turkish twins
Turkish women's volleyball players
VakıfBank S.K. volleyballers
People from Kütahya
Twin sportspeople
Olympic volleyball players of Turkey
Volleyball players at the 2012 Summer Olympics
Maltepe University alumni
Mediterranean Games gold medalists for Turkey
Mediterranean Games silver medalists for Turkey
Mediterranean Games medalists in volleyball
Competitors at the 2005 Mediterranean Games
Competitors at the 2013 Mediterranean Games